Elizabeth Street Mall is a pedestrian street mall in Hobart, Tasmania. It is located on Elizabeth Street between Collins Street and Liverpool Street. It is the largest shopping area in the Hobart city centre. It is also a busy meeting place and busking area.

References

Pedestrian malls in Australia
Shopping districts and streets in Australia
Streets in Hobart
Tourist attractions in Hobart